Mike Wong Mun Heng is a Singaporean association football manager who was the head coach of Laos from June 2017 to August 2017. Wong managed Geylang United from 2009 to early 2012. Wong was also in charge of the Singapore U-22 which participated at the 2013 AFC U-22 Championship qualifiers. He is appointed as technical director of National Football Association of Brunei Darussalam in October 2013 and as head coach of Brunei national team in December 2014 making him the first Singaporean to lead a senior national team other than Singapore in a World Cup qualifiers.

Statistics

Managerial

References

1965 births
Living people
Singaporean football managers
Brunei national football team managers
Singaporean sportspeople of Chinese descent
Singaporean expatriate football managers
Singaporean expatriate sportspeople in Laos
Expatriate football managers in Laos
Laos national football team managers
Expatriate football managers in Brunei
Singaporean expatriate sportspeople in Brunei